Gabriel López Reza (born 10 February 2003) is a Mexican professional footballer who plays as an forward for Liga MX club Mazatlán.

Career statistics

Club

Notes

References

External links
 
 
 

Living people
2003 births
Association football forwards
Liga MX players
Mazatlán F.C. footballers
Footballers from Michoacán
Mexican footballers
People from Parácuaro